Myopini is a tribe of flies from the family Conopidae.

Genera
Myopa Fabricius, 1775
Thecophora Rondani, 1845

References

Conopidae
Brachycera tribes
Taxa named by Johan Christian Fabricius